Robert Curry Talbot (20 September 1908 – 1971) was an English professional association footballer who played as a full back. He played for four clubs in the Football League during the 1930s, making 23 league appearances.

References

1908 births
1971 deaths
Footballers from Sunderland
English footballers
Association football defenders
West Ham United F.C. players
Burnley F.C. players
Newport County A.F.C. players
Wigan Athletic F.C. players
Oldham Athletic A.F.C. players
English Football League players
Date of death missing